Cristy Nurse (born December 5, 1986, in Georgetown, Ontario) is a Canadian rower.

In June 2016, she was officially named to Canada's 2016 Olympic team.

References

 

1986 births
Living people
Canadian female rowers
World Rowing Championships medalists for Canada
Rowers at the 2016 Summer Olympics
Olympic rowers of Canada
21st-century Canadian women